The  is a city tram line in Takaoka and Imizu, Toyama Prefecture, Japan, operated by Manyosen.

Line data
Total distance: 7.9 km
Gauge: 1,067 mm
Stations: 17
Double track sections: Between Hirokōji Station and Yonejimaguchi Station
Electrified sections: Entire track (600 V DC)
Closing method: Automatic

Stations
Takaoka Station (connecting to Takaoka Station of JR West)
Suehirochō Station
Kataharamachi Station
Sakashita-machi Station
Kyūkan Iryō Center-mae Station
Hirokōji Station
Shikino Chūgakkō-mae Station
Shiminbyōin-mae Station
Ejiri Station
Asahigaoka Station
Ogino Station
Shin Nōmachi Station
Yonejimaguchi Station
Nōmachiguchi Station
Shin Yoshihisa Station
Yoshihisa Station
Naka Fushiki Station
Rokudōji Station (connecting service to Shinminatokō Line)

External links
Man'yōsen surrounding and map  (private site)

Transport in Toyama Prefecture
Railway lines in Japan